Karl Friedrich Curschmann (June 21, 1805 – August 24, 1841) was a German song composer and singer.

Life
Curschmann was born in 1805, in Berlin. His talent for singing was discovered when he was at school. In 1824, having been a law student in Berlin and Göttingen, he started to devote his life to music.  He went to Kassel where he studied under Spohr and Hauptmann, starting with church music. At Kassel in 1828 he wrote his first opera Abdul und Errinieh oder Toten.

After four years in Kassel, Curschmann returned to Berlin. After 1837 he lived with Rose Behrend, daughter of a Danzig businessman and herself a singer, before they married and engaged heavily in the musical life of Berlin. He befriended Eduard Grell, director of the Berlin Song Academy.

Curschmann wrote 83 songs, many to the poems of Goethe, Schiller, Heine and Rückert.

Curschmann died in Langfuhr, near Danzig, in 1841.

Compositions

Books of songs
 Wiegenlied
 Die Stillen Wanderer
 Der Abend Standchen
 Der Fischer Altes Volkslied
 Jagerlied
 Au Rose der Schiffer
 Der kleine Hans

Opera
 Abdul und Errinieh oder Toten

References

External links
 Karl Friedrich Curschmann in Grande Musica

19th-century classical composers
German opera composers
Male opera composers
1805 births
1841 deaths
Musicians from Berlin
German male classical composers
19th-century German composers
19th-century German male musicians